Chrysallida menkhorsti is a species of sea snail, a marine gastropod mollusk in the family Pyramidellidae, the pyrams and their allies. The species is one a number within the gastropod genus Chrysallida.

Distribution
This species occurs in the following locations:

 Northern Atlantic Ocean

References

External links
 To Encyclopedia of Life
 To World Register of Marine Species

menkhorsti
Gastropods described in 2000
Molluscs of the Atlantic Ocean